Adeline McKinlay was an American tennis player of the end of the 19th century. 

She notably won the US Women's National Championship in 1892 in women's doubles with Mabel Cahill.

Grand Slam finals

Doubles (1 title)

Notes

Year of birth missing
Year of death missing
19th-century American people
19th-century female tennis players
American female tennis players
United States National champions (tennis)
Grand Slam (tennis) champions in women's doubles